Johann Sebastian Bach composed the church cantata  (Merciful heart of eternal love), 185 in Weimar for the fourth Sunday after Trinity and first performed it on 14 July 1715.

Bach composed the cantata as concertmaster in Weimar, responsible for one church cantata per month. The text was written by the court poet Salomon Franck for the occasion and published in 1715. He included as the closing choral the first stanza of Johannes Agricola's hymn "". The cantata is structured in six movements begins with a duet, followed by a sequence of alternating arias and recitatives and closed by a four-part chorale. It is scored for a small ensemble of four vocal parts, oboe, strings and continuo.

Bach led the first performance in the court chapel of Schloss Weimar on 14 July 1715.

History and words 

On 2 March 1714 Bach was appointed concertmaster of the Weimar court capelle of the co-reigning dukes Wilhelm Ernst and Ernst August of Saxe-Weimar. He wrote this cantata for the Fourth Sunday after Trinity.

The prescribed readings for the Sunday were from the Epistle to the Romans, "For the earnest expectation of the creature waiteth for the manifestation of the sons of God", and from the Sermon on the Mount in the Gospel of Luke: the injunctions to "be merciful", "judge not". Franck stayed close to the theme of the gospel, recalling the injunctions and the parables of the mote and the beam and the blind leading the blind. The last aria summarizes the admonitions as "" (This is the Christians' art). The cantata is closed by the first stanza of Johannes Agricola's hymn "" (1531). Albert Schweitzer criticized the libretto as "bland, lesson-like".

Bach first performed the cantata on 14 July 1715. He dated it himself "1715". When Bach performed the cantata again in Leipzig on 20 June 1723, he transposed it from F-sharp minor to G minor and made changes to the instrumentation. He treated the same chorale in the chorale cantata , for the same occasion in 1724. Bach revived the cantata once more in 1746 or 1747.

Music

Structure and scoring 
Bach structured the cantata in six movements, beginning with a duet, followed by a series of alternating recitatives and arias and concluded by a chorale. Similar to several other cantatas on words by Franck, it is scored for a small ensemble: four vocal soloists (soprano (S), alto (A), tenor (T) and bass (B)), oboe (Ob), two violins (Vl), viola (Va), and basso continuo (Bc) including bassoon (Fg). A choir is only needed for the chorale, if at all. The score, partly an autograph, is titled "Concerto. / Dominica post Trinit: / Brmhertziges Hertze der ewigen Liebe. ect. / â 5 Strom. 4 Voci / Tromba / 1 Hautb 2 Violini. 1 Viola. / Violoncello / è Fagotto. S. A. T. è Baßo con Cont. / di JSbach. / 1715", while "tromba" (trumpet) is struck in the cover of the set of parts.

In Leipzig the oboe was replaced by a clarino (trumpet) for the instrumental cantus firmus of the chorale in the first movement. The duration is given as 16 minutes.

In the following table of the movements, the scoring and keys are given for the version performed in Weimar in 1714. The keys and time signatures are taken from the Bach scholar Alfred Dürr, using the symbol for common time (4/4). The instruments are shown separately for winds and strings, while the continuo, playing throughout, is not shown.

Movements

1 

The opening movement is a duet of soprano and tenor, "" (Compassionate heart of eternal love). It is in two ways connected to the chorale which closes the work. The first interval in the voices and the continuo is the same as in the chorale. The countersubject is the inversion of the theme, in German "" (reflection in a mirror). It reflects the theme as human mercy should reflect divine mercy. John Eliot Gardiner, who conducted the Bach Cantata Pilgrimage with the Monteverdi Choir in 2000, comments in his diary of the project: "Cast as a siciliano for soprano and tenor with cello continuo, there is a warm glow to this opening duet, with trills on each of the main beats to signify the flickering flame of love, and a plea to 'come melt my heart'. Agricola's chorale tune [...] is meanwhile intoned by a clarino hovering above the two amorous vocal lines.

2 
The alto recitative, "" (You hearts, which have changed yourselves into rocks and stones), is first accompanied by the strings, but ends as an arioso with continuo.

3 
The alto aria, "" (Be inspired at the present time) shows the richest instrumentation, with figurative oboe solos.

4 
The bass recitative "" (Self-love flatters itself!) is accompanied only by the continuo.

5 
The text of the bass aria with continuo, "" (This is the Christian's art), summarizes all injunctions in one long sentence, but Bach splits it in parts, all introduced by the keywords "". In Leipzig, the continuo of cello and bass in octaves was doubled by the strings, another octave higher. Gardiner admires Bach's treatment as a "gentle, parodistic way he portrays the rhetorical displays of a pompous preacher".

6 
The closing chorale, "" (I call to You, Lord Jesus Christ), summarizes the topic of the cantata to love and serve the neighbour.

It is illuminated by a "soaring" violin as a fifth part, similar to the treatment in the cantata for Pentecost the previous year, .

Reception 
The musicologist Isoyama summarizes: "... we are bound to admire the emotional wealth with which Bach's music infuses the poetry. In that it gives living reality to a potentially dry text, this work may be numbered among Bach's masterpieces".

Recordings 
The listing is taken from the selection provided on the Bach Cantatas Website. Ensembles playing period instruments in historically informed performance are marked by green background.

References

Sources 
 
 Barmherziges Herze der ewigen Liebe BWV 185; BC A 101 / Sacred cantata (4th Sunday after Trinity), Bach Digital
 Luke Dahn: BWV 185.6 bach-chorales.com

External links 
 Barmherziges Herze der ewigen Liebe, BWV 185: performance by the Netherlands Bach Society (video and background information)

Church cantatas by Johann Sebastian Bach
1715 compositions